Tervakoski is a small town in Janakkala, Finland. In 2021, there were 3,972 inhabitants.

A well-known and popular amusement park Puuhamaa is located in the village.

Tervakoski Oy paper mill, established in 1818, is located in Tervakoski.

References

External links 
 Tervakoski.fi

Janakkala
Villages in Finland